Lugo is a city in northwestern Spain in the autonomous community of Galicia. It is the capital of the province of Lugo. The municipality had a population of 98,025 in 2018, making it the fourth most populous city in Galicia.

Lugo is the only city in the world to be surrounded by completely intact Roman walls, which reach a height of  along a  circuit ringed with 71 towers. The walk along the top is continuous around the circuit and features ten gates. These 3rd century walls are protected by UNESCO as a World Heritage Site. The city's historic bridge over the Miño is essentially of Roman date, though many repairs over the centuries have effaced its Roman character. It is along the Camino Primitivo path of the Camino de Santiago.

Population
The population of the city in 2018 was 98,026 inhabitants, which has been growing constantly since the first census in 1842, despite the fact that the rest of the province is losing population dramatically. The population of the city in 2014 was 98,560 inhabitants (45,948 men and 52,612 women). From INE (Instituto Nacional de Estadística).

By April 2020, the population had grown to 99,638. Reaching 100,000 inhabitants is one of the goals of the city Mayor, Lara Méndez.

In 2010 there were 5,373 foreigners living in the city, representing 5.5% of the total population. The main nationalities are Colombians (18%), Moroccans (12%) and Brazilians (11%).

By language, according to 2008 data, 47.37% of the population speaks always or mainly in Galician, 52.63% speaks always or mainly in Spanish.

Geography

The town lies on a hill surrounded by the rivers Miño, Rato and Chanca. The difference in altitude between the city centre and the river banks is considerable: the former being at an altitude of 465 meters above sea level, whilst the Miño River Walk is at an altitude of only . The outline of the city was declared a Biosphere Reserve by UNESCO on 7 November 2002, this being the most important recognition at international level regarding the conservation of landscapes and habitats of this Atlantic European region.

The area has been divided into more than 54 villages:
Adai, Bacurín, Bascuas, Bazar, Benade, Bocamaos, Bóveda, O Burgo, Calde, Camoira, Carballido, Coeo, Coeses, Cuíña, Esperante,
Gondar, Labio, Lamas, Lugo, Mazoi, Meilán, Monte de Meda, Muxa, Ombreiro, Orbazai, O Outeiro das Camoiras, Pedreda, Pías, Piúgos, Poutomillos, Prógalo, Recimil, Ribas de Miño, Romeán, Rubiás, Saa, San Mamede dos Anxos, San Martiño de Piñeiro,
San Pedro de Mera, San Román, San Salvador de Muxa, San Xoán de Pena, San Xoán do Alto, San Xoán do Campo, Santa Comba, Santa María de Alta, Santa Marta de Fixós, Santalla de Bóveda de Mera, Santo André de Castro, Soñar, Teixeiro, Tirimol, Torible, O Veral, Vilachá de Mera.

Climate
Lugo has a humid oceanic climate with drier summers, Cfb in the Köppen climate classification although it could also be classified as a mild Mediterranean climate (Csb) depending on favoured summer precipitation threshold. Due to its remoteness from the Atlantic, its annual precipitation of  can be considered low compared with areas of the Rias Baixas and Santiago de Compostela. The city has an average of six days of snow per year, which is a contrast to coastal cities of Galicia which have not received snow in modern times.

<div>

History

Later conquered by Paullus Fabius Maximus and called Lucus Augusti in 13 BC on the positioning of a Roman military camp, while the Roman Empire completed the conquest, in the North, of the Iberian Peninsula. Situated in what was the Roman province of Hispania Tarraconensis, it was the chief town of the tribe of the Capori. Though small it was the most important Roman town in what became Gallaecia during the Roman period, the seat of a conventus, one of three in Gallaecia, and later became one of the two capitals of Gallaecia, and gave its name to the Callaïci Lucenses. It was centrally situated in a large gold mining region, which during the Roman period was very active. The Conventus Lucensis, according to Pliny, began at the river Navilubio, and contained 16 peoples; besides the Celtici and Lebuni. Though these tribes were not powerful, and their names "barbarous" to Roman ears, there were among them 166,000 freemen. The city stood on one of the upper branches of the Minius (modern Miño), on the road from Bracara to Asturica, and had some famous baths, near from the bridge across the Miño.

Lucus was the seat of a bishopric by the later 5th century at the latest and remained an administrative center under the Suebi and Visigoths, before going into such a decline that the site was found to be deserted in the middle of the 8th century by Bishop Odoario, who set about reviving it. 10th century attempts at rebuilding its casas destructas (abandoned tenements) suggest that it remained a town only on paper: the seat of a bishopric, administered by a count, from which royal charters were issued. "Its commercial and industrial role was insignificant", Richard Fletcher wrote of 11th century Lugo.

During the Middle Ages Lugo, like Santiago de Compostela, was a center of pilgrimage, because the cathedral had the special privilege, which it still retains today, of exposing to the public the consecrated host twenty-four hours a day. In the 18th century Lugo was granted the privilege of organizing the fairs of St. Froilán. During the Modern Age, Lugo had a certain supremacy, although other nearby towns such as Mondoñedo or Ribadeo disputed it. It was not until the division of the state into provinces in 1833 and the creation of provincial governments that Lugo has become the most important town in the province of Lugo, because of its capital status. This rise has been bolstered by the arrival of the first railroad to the city in 1875.

During the 20th century the city continued to grow as the administration and services center of the province. In 1936, when the Civil War broke out, the city became quickly under the Nationalists control. In the 1970s the city undertook important reforms, like the development of the Ceao Industrial Area (1979) and the complete restoration of the Roman walls.

Infanta Elena, the elder daughter of King Juan Carlos and Queen Sofía of Spain and fourth in the line of succession to the Spanish throne, has been duchess of Lugo since 1995.

In 2000, the recognition of the Roman walls on UNESCO's World Heritage Site was an important event in the city.

Economy
Lugo is a city of services. The main activities are commercial, the administration (offices of the autonomous and central Governments) and educational and health services (the recently opened Hospital Universitario Lucus Augusti is the largest in Galicia). The steady increase of population of the city has coincided with the development of the major economic sectors of the municipality. Industry is scarce and almost exclusively dedicated to the processing of agricultural products (dairy, meat, timber ...).

There is a shopping center on the outskirts of the city (As Termas), with an Eroski hypermarket, cinemas, clothing stores like H&M, NewYorker or Cortefiel and many restaurants and fast food chains like McDonald's. A new shopping center (Abella) has opened in late 2015 and hosts an E.Leclerc hypermarket, a bowling court, cinemas and a McFit fitness center.

The University of Santiago de Compostela has several faculties at its Lugo Campus, one of the most important being the Faculty of Veterinary sciences, one of the leading in its field in Spain.

The daily newspaper , is published in the city. It's the most read newspaper in the province of Lugo.

There is a private aerodrome in the nearby town of Rozas, owned by the Spanish Ministry of Defence and administered by Real Aero Club de Lugo. In 2011, the Ministry of Defence transferred the installations to INTA, Spain's space agency, in order to convert it into a center of aeronautical research,

Main sights

Lugo is the only city in the world to be surrounded by completely intact Roman walls, which reach a height of 10 to 15 metres along a 2117 m circuit ringed with 71 towers. The walk along the top is continuous round the circuit, and features ten gates. These 3rd century walls are protected by UNESCO as a World Heritage Site. The bridge over the Miño is essentially of Roman date, though many repairs over the centuries have effaced its Roman character.

Other sources suggest that the name Lucus Augusti comes from the Latin word Lucus, which means "sacred grove", or "sacred forest", as the city was founded on the place of a small grove.

Besides the walls, sights include:
 the Cathedral, dedicated to St. Mary, built about 1129, though the actual main façade and towers date only from 1769. Its elegant stalls were carved by Francisco Mouro in 1624. This cathedral enjoys the privilege of having the Blessed Sacrament perpetually exposed, a fact commemorated in the armorial bearings of the town.
 Convent and church of St. Francis, in Gothic style, with remains of the sober cloister. It currently houses the Museo Provincial, which shows a display of Galician art and other building of the 18th century
 Church of St. Dominic
 City Hall (Casa do Concello in Galician), a large Baroque structure with a mid-18th century façade. Annexed is a clock tower, originally from the 16th century, but rebuilt later.
 Palace of the arts (Círculo das Artes)
 The Roman Bridge over river Miño.
 Rosalía de Castro Park, a 23 ha park in the city center. It has a small pond in the middle and contains many species of trees, like three sequoias.
 Museo Interactivo de Historia de Lugo (MIHL), an interactive museum about the history of the city, made by Nieto Sobejano arquitectos.

Two important festivals take place in Lugo:
 Saint Froilan festivity, which lasts from 4–12 October, dedicated to the city's patron saint. It's a Fiesta of National Tourist Interest and it's very popular to eat polbo á feira in one of the many stands near Rosalía de Castro park.
 Arde Lucus, festival celebrated in the last weeks of June which revives the Roman and castro past of the city, and which emerged to commemorate the declaration of the city's Roman wall as a World Heritage Site in 2000. In its latest editions it has reached nearly half a million visitors.

Sports
The most popular and known professional team of the city is the basketball team CB Breogán, currently playing in Liga ACB, the first division in Spain, the team has played many seasons in Liga ACB the top Spanish basketball league. The team occupies the 9th position in the historical ranking of that league.

Futsal is also popular in Lugo, represented by Azkar Lugo, which plays in Spanish first division.

The football team of Lugo is CD Lugo, currently playing in Spanish Segunda División.

The fifth stage of the 2016 Vuelta a España cycling race finished in Lugo.

International relations

Twin towns – sister cities
Lugo is twinned with:

 Ferrol, Spain
 Dinan, France
 Viana do Castelo, Portugal
 Qinhuangdao, China

See also
 Diocese of Lugo
 List of Spanish cities
 List of municipalities in Lugo

Notes

References

External links

 
Municipalities in the Province of Lugo
13 BC establishments